Al-Itihaad al-Islamiya (AIAI) was an Islamist militant group in Somalia. It is considered a terrorist organisation by the United States, the United Kingdom and New Zealand.

History
In the early 1990s, as Somalia fell into disorder following the collapse of the Siad Barre regime, Osama bin Laden took advantage of the chaos to fund al-Itihaad, later sending foreign militants who trained and fought alongside al-Itihaad members, with the goal of creating an Islamist state in the Horn of Africa. AIAI was also active in setting up sharia courts. Despite its association with al-Qaeda, other analysts cautioned against overgeneralisation, noting that al-Itihaad had elements of a genuine social movement and that the characters of sub-factions throughout the country substantially differed from each other.

By 1994, al-Itihaad had established itself in the Somali Region of Ethiopia. According to a report by the Emergency Unit for Ethiopia of the UNDP, al-Itihaad were most active in the area between Kebri Dahar, Danan, Kelafo and Degehabur. Some elements were reported to be active near Danot, Nusdariiq and 'Adow. Although they had support amongst the Ogaden, at the time their activities were not tolerated by the Isaaq and Dhulbahante clans. Al-Itihaad sent a delegation to the Peace and Unity Conference of the Somali Nation, which was held February 1995 at Kebri Dehar, at which they made pledges which would cause the organisation to effectively cease to exist as a political and military force within the Ogaden. Despite this promise al-Itihaad continued to engage in violent actions after this congress. One was the attempted assassination of then Minister of Transportation and Communications, Abdul Majid Hussein in 1996. Another was in March of that year, when they raided areas in the Jigjiga Zone controlled by the Abskuul clan, apparently in collaboration with disaffected members of this clan. Established local security forces cleared al-Itihaad infiltrators from the Jigjiga Zone, and the defeated remnants retreated to disputed border areas between the Somali and Oromia regions, which has served as a refuge for them, as well as for Oromo fundamentalist rebel groups.

An article published in the San Francisco Chronicle on 16 December 2001 quoted unnamed intelligence officials who claimed AIAI was extensively connected to al-Barakat.
The San Francisco Chronicle called al-Barakat a Somali-based business conglomerate and money transfer organisation. They quoted former U.S. Treasury Secretary Paul H. O'Neill who called al-Barakat as one of the "financiers of terrorism". The 9/11 Commission report subsequently cleared al-Barakat of involvement in financing the 9/11 hijackers, the 9/11 Commission determined that the 9/11 hijackers received their remote funds transfers through US financial institutions, not Islamic financial institutions.

Funded by wealthy Saudis, al-Itihaad had extensive connections with the Somali expatriate community in Kenya, in particular the Eastleigh district of Nairobi and the predominantly Muslim coastal regions. At its height, the AIAI militia numbered over 1,000.
According to U.S. intelligence officials, al-Itihaad cooperated with the al-Qaeda operatives who carried out the 1998 United States embassy bombings in Nairobi and Dar es Salaam that killed 224 people.

On 7–8 March 1999, Ethiopia claimed it had made a cross-border incursion into Balanbale searching for members of AIAI who had reportedly kidnapped a person and stolen medical supplies, and denied reports of looting. Allegations from that time also claim Ethiopia was the supplier of various Somali warlords, while Eritrea was arming other warlords.

On 24 September 2001, AIAI's finances were sanctioned by the administration of U.S. President George W. Bush under Executive Order 13224. Its then-head Hassan Dahir Aweys was also sanctioned under Executive Order 13224 in November of that year.
In June 2004, Hassan Abdullah Hersi al-Turki, who had become leader of the organisation, was also sanctioned for his connections to bin Laden.
Al-Qaeda operatives were reported to have used the AIAI base on the island of Ras Kamboni, south of Kismayo near the border with Kenya.
Other sources indicate that al-Qaeda formed a training camp on Kamboni, while al-Itihaad set up its own training camp at Las Quoay near the northeast port of Bosaso. In the aftermath of the September 11 attacks in 2001, these camps were dismantled and the hundreds of trained militants sailed for the safety of tribal areas in Yemen.

Shortly thereafter it was claimed that al-Itihaad had dissolved as an organisation. Sheikh Aweys went on to become one of the leaders of the Courts of the Islamic Courts Union (ICU). Hassan al-Turki went on to lead Hizbul Shabaab before ceding the organisation to Aden Hashi Farah Ayro.

Members
The following individuals were considered to be members of AIAI:

 Sheikh Mohamed Haji Yusuf Al-Itihaad leader in Gedo region's 1992–1998
 Hassan Dahir Aweys
 Hassan Abdullah Hersi al-Turki
 Abu Talha al-Sudani
 Gouled Hassan Dourad
 Fahad Yasin - Later head of Somalia's National Intelligence and Security Agency (NISA) and political ally of President Farmaajo

References

1994 establishments in Somalia
2006 disestablishments in Somalia
Defunct organizations designated as terrorist in Africa
Entities added to the Consolidated List by Australia
Factions in the Somali Civil War
Islamist groups
Jihadist groups
Organisations designated as terrorist by New Zealand
Organisations designated as terrorist by the United Kingdom
Organizations designated as terrorist by the United States